Milan Timko (born 28 November 1972) is a former Slovak football player.

Timko played for several top Slovak clubs before moving to Czech Baník Ostrava in 1997. In 1998 Timko moved to Slovan Bratislava, where he won the Slovak Superliga and Slovak Cup in 1999. He also played for several clubs in Turkey, Denmark and Austria. Timko was a regular for the Slovakia national football team.

External links
 

Slovak footballers
Slovakia international footballers
1972 births
Sportspeople from Prešov
Living people
FC Baník Ostrava players
ŠK Slovan Bratislava players
Kocaelispor footballers
Adanaspor footballers
AaB Fodbold players
Slovak expatriate footballers
Slovak expatriate sportspeople in Austria
Slovak expatriate sportspeople in Turkey
Expatriate footballers in the Czech Republic
Expatriate footballers in Turkey
Association football defenders